Saunkan Saunkne is a 2022 Indian Punjabi-language, romantic comedy film directed by Amarjit Singh Saron. The film made under the banner of Naad SStudios, Dreamiyata Pvt. Ltd and JR Production House, stars Ammy Virk, Sargun Mehta and Nimrat Khaira. It was released on 13 May 2022 in theaters.

The film is currently among the second highest-grossing Punjabi films with a worldwide gross of  crore in forty five days of its release.

Synopsis
Nirmal and Naseeb are happily married couple. They have everything but not a child. After eight years of marriage they still miss something. On suggestion of her mother-in-law, Naseeb persuades Nirmal to have a second marriage with her younger sister Kirna. Now the real drama begins as sharing her husband proves to be a difficult task for Naseeb. Kirna dominates and wins heart of her husband and mother-in-law and that changed everything for Naseeb. Small squabbles between the two wives lead to comic situation and fun begins.

Cast
 Ammy Virk as Nirmal Singh (husband) 
 Sargun Mehta as Naseeb "Seebo" Kaur (first wife)
 Nimrat Khaira as Kirna (second wife)
 Nirmal Rishi as mother of Nirmal Singh
 Kaka Kautki as Naseeb and Kirna’s brother
 Sukhwinder Chahal as Naseeb and Kirna’s father and Nirmal’s father-in-law
 Mohini Toor as Naseeb and Kirna’s mother and Nirmal’s mother-in-law
 Ravinder Mand
 Gagneet Singh Makhan as Kiran’s fiancé

Production

Development
The film was announced in June 2020 with lead cast of Ammy Virk, Sargun Mehta and Nimrat Khaira.

Filming
Principal photography of Saunkan Saunkne began in October 2020 and the film was completed within a couple of months.

Music
Soundtrack of Saunkan Saunkne is composed by Desi Crew on lyrics by Raj Ranjodh, Bunty Bains, Rony Ajnali, Gill Machhrai and Arjan Virk. The songs are sung by Ammy Virk, Nimrat Khaira, Raj Ranjodh, Miss Pooja and Gurlez Akhtar. The soundtrack is released on Tips Punjabi. First track "Gall Mann Le Meri" was released on April 24, 2022. Second track "Sade Kothe Ute" was released on 1 May 2022. Title track "Saunkan Saunkne" was released on 4 May 2022.

Track list

Release
Initially film was slated to release on 14 April 2022 but it was postponed to 6 May 2022. But, it was pushed back and theatrically released on 13 May 2022.It is available on amazon prime video from June 2022.

Reception

Critical response
Neha Vashist rated the film with 3.5 stars out of 5 and appreciated the story by Amberdeep Singh and direction of Amarjit Singh Saron stating, "Every scene in the movie had a lingering effect, and that happens only when the captain of the ship has a tight grip over his project." Praising the performance of cast, she wrote, "everyones’ performance was engaging and the script in itself was very entertaining; thus, it is a laughter riot." Vashist criticised the length of the film stating, "The movie seemed a little stretched in the second half". Concluding the review for The Times of India, she said, "Nevertheless, it still offers you a great dose of laughter and is a perfect family entertainer."

Sheetal writing for The Tribune praised the performance, direction and music of the film. She appreciated the comedy writing, "The film is packed with punches and some of them are even worth taking home!" Concluding her review, she stated, "It’s tough to decide whether acting, casting, direction or script has a bigger role to play in it [star cast performances]!"
Kiddan rated the film with 3.5 stars out of 5 and praised the performances of lead actors writing, "All three of the lead actors proved to be really acclaimed and masters of their art." They were critical of screenplay but appreciated dialogues. They also criticised the direction and editing but praised the music. Appreciating the comedy sequences, Kidaan concluded, "we conclude the film as a good entertainer which has the power to uplift your mood and make your family share a bundle of laughter."

Box Office
Saunkan Saunkne earned  crore in domestic box office on first day of its release. The film collected  crore at the North America box office,  crore from Australia,  lakhs from UK & Ireland,  lakhs at the New Zealand box office and  lakhs from Germany over the first weekend. Its Indian collection for the weekend is  crore, and  it is  crore. 

The film , has grossed  crore worldwide.

References

External links
 

2022 films
Indian romantic comedy films
Punjabi-language Indian films
2022 romantic comedy films